The Conjugal Bed can refer to:

 The Conjugal Bed (1963 film), a 1963 Italian film
 The Conjugal Bed (1993 film), a 1993 Romanian film